Joseph Riddick (1735 - Nov. 18, 1818) was a North Carolina politician who served as Speaker of the North Carolina Senate for 11 years from 1800 to 1804 and from 1806 to 1811. Only Bartlett Yancey and Marc Basnight have led the state Senate for a longer span of time.  Riddick was also a veteran of the American Revolutionary War.  He attained the rank of General in the NC Militia.

Early life
Joseph was born in about 1735, probably in that portion of Perquimans County, North Carolina that became Gates County in 1779.  His parents were Captain Joseph Riddick (16891759) and Hannah (Hunter) Riddick (about 17121791).  His mother was the daughter of Isaac and Elizabeth Hunter.  Joseph  Married Ann Stallings (?1824), who was the daughter of Simon Stallings.

Professor and historian Isaac Samauel Harrell writes the following
Although no returns can be obtained further back than 1842, the county was in all probability anti-Federalist in the early days, for Joseph Riddick, who was in the assembly for 33 years, voted with the anti-Federalists.  He never wanted to spend any money. The county was opposed to internal improvements and to the Literary Fund.

Political career
Joseph Riddick was the leading man in the county from the close of the Revolutionary War to his death. He was in the Assembly from 1781 to 1811 and again in 1815 and 1817. For eleven years he was the speaker of the Senate; was a representative from Gates County to the Hillsborough Convention of 1788 that debated the Constitution of the United States. During its sessions he made himself distinguished on account of his common sense. He bitterly opposed the ratification by the state of the Virginia and Kentucky Resolutions and their defeat is largely due to him. He was also a member of the convention of 1835 for a new constitution for the state. In 1798 Governor Samuel Johnston wrote to Supreme Court Justice James Iredell, 
"There are some men of very good understanding in both houses. Riddick, from Gates, has more influence in the Senate; he seems generally disposed to do what is right, but will go about it in his own way." 
He made his trips to Raleigh in a stick-gig and never missed a session. At his old home is a grape-vine that he brought from Raleigh when he was a member of the Assembly.

He represented Gates County, North Carolina in the North Carolina General Assembly over a period of 35 years, including service in the North Carolina House of Commons (17811785) and in the North Carolina Senate (1785–1811, 1815, 1817).  He ran unsuccessfully for the United States House of Representatives as a Democratic-Republican in 1810 and 1813 (and also got a handful of votes, likely unsolicited, in 1815).

 North Carolina House of Commons (five consecutive terms)
 North Carolina General Assembly of 1781
 North Carolina General Assembly of 1782
 North Carolina General Assembly of 1783
 North Carolina General Assembly of April 1784
 North Carolina General Assembly of October 1784
 North Carolina Senate (27 consecutive terms)
 North Carolina General Assembly of 1785, 1786, 1787, 1788, 1789, 1790, 1791-1792, 1792-1793, 1793-1794, 1794-1795, 1795, 1796, 1797, 1798, 1799, 1800, 1801, 1802, 1803, 1804, 1805, 1806, 1807, 1808, 1809, 1811 
 1815, 1817 (two consecutive terms)

He was a Presidential elector for the state of North Carolina on 2 occasions—1809-Madison, 1817-Monroe.

Patriotic Service
Joseph was a member of the Chowan County Committee of Safety in 1776.

Commissioner
The following court record is stating that he was to be a commissioner to establish the county boundary line between Gates & Perquimans.
 An Act to appoint commissioners to lay off and establish the dividing line between the counties of Perquimans and Gates
 Whereas, the dividing line between the counties of Perquimans and Gates have not heretofore been sufficiently described, either by actual surveys, or by known and fixed boundaries, whereby it becomes expedient in order to prevent disputes between the inhabitants of said counties, that the said dividing line should be more accurately ascertained and laid off.
 Be it enacted by the General Assembly of the State of North Carolina, and it is hereby enacted by the authority of the same, That Willis Riddick and Langley Billups, of the county of Perquimans, and Joseph Gordon and Joseph Riddick of the county of Gates, be, and they are hereby appointed commissioners with full power and authority to lay off, extend and mark the line between the said counties, due  regard being had to the former reputed line.
 And be it further enacted, That the said Commissioners shall appoint such surveyor, chain carrier and other attendance as shall be necessary for the marking, extending and establishing the said line, and shall make or cause to be made a return of their proceedings to each of the Courts of Pleas and Quarter Sessions of the said counties, to be deposited and kept among the records thereof, and the said lines when so extended, and laid off, shall forever thereafter be established, and confirmed as the dividing line between the said counties.
 And be it further enacted, That the said commissioners, surveyors, chain carriers and attendants, shall receive such compensation for their services as the Courts of Pleas and Quarter Sessions of the said counties shall deem just, to be paid out of the monies levied and collected for the said counties.

Death
Joseph died September 1818. In his will, dated July 24, 1818, he mentions his wife Ann; sons Reuben, Isaiah, and Arthur; daughters Hannah Rogerson, Easter Billups, Avis Eason, and Mabel Hill; and grandsons Josiah, Kedar, and Nathan Riddick, Mills Hill, Langley Billups, Solomon Eason, and Jesse Rogerson.

Notes

References

 
 , dead link
 , mentions Christopher and Kadar Reddick
 John L. Cheney, comp., North Carolina Government, 1585–1979 (1981).
 Walter Clark, ed., State Records of North Carolina, vol. 22 (1907).
 R. D. W. Connor, comp., A Documentary History of the University of North Carolina, 1776–1799, vol. 1 (1953).
 Guion G. Johnson, Ante-Bellum North Carolina (1937).
 Griffith J. McRee, Life and Correspondence of James Iredell, vol. 2 (1858).
 William C. Pool, "An Economic Interpretation of the Ratification of the Federal Constitution in North Carolina," North Carolina Historical Review 27 (1950).
 Raleigh Register, 9 Oct. 1818.
 William L. Saunders, ed., Colonial Records of North Carolina, vol. 10 (1890).

Members of the North Carolina House of Representatives
North Carolina state senators
1735 births
1818 deaths
North Carolina militiamen in the American Revolution